2015 was another tough year for the Chiefs rugby team. They won 10 of their Super Rugby games and finished 5th overall on the table for the 2nd year in a row, and 3rd behind the Hurricanes and Highlanders in the New Zealand Conference. Playing the Highlanders in the qualifying finals in Dunedin was always going to be tough losing 24-14.

Standings

The final standings of the 2015 Super Rugby season were:

Results

The following fixtures were released on 18 September 2014:

Squad

The Chiefs squad for the 2015 Super Rugby season were:

Player statistics

The Chiefs players' appearance and scoring statistics for the 2015 Super Rugby season are:

Notes and references

External links
Official Chiefs website
Official Super Rugby website
Official Facebook page

2015
2015 in New Zealand rugby union
2015 Super Rugby season by team